Black Creek Township is one of the fourteen townships of Mercer County, Ohio, United States.  The 2000 census found 631 people in the township.

Geography
Located in the northwestern corner of the county, it borders the following townships:
Willshire Township, Van Wert County – north
Liberty Township, Van Wert County – northeast corner
Dublin Township – east
Hopewell Township – southeast corner
Liberty Township – south
Jefferson Township, Adams County, Indiana – southwest
Blue Creek Township, Adams County, Indiana – northwest

No municipalities are located in Black Creek Township.

Name and history
Black Creek Township was organized in 1834. It is the only Black Creek Township statewide.

Government
The township is governed by a three-member board of trustees, who are elected in November of odd-numbered years to a four-year term beginning on the following January 1. Two are elected in the year after the presidential election and one is elected in the year before it. There is also an elected township fiscal officer, who serves a four-year term beginning on April 1 of the year after the election, which is held in November of the year before the presidential election. Vacancies in the fiscal officership or on the board of trustees are filled by the remaining trustees.

References

External links
County website

Townships in Mercer County, Ohio
Townships in Ohio